Nithya Ravindran is an Indian actress and dubbing artist who works primarily in Malayalam and Tamil films and television.

Background

Her father was a government employee and mother was a house wife. Her father had a drama troupe and she started as child artist in her father's dramas. She has one younger sister, Jayasree and one elder sister, Kalyani . She had her primary education from Stella Matutina College of Education, Chennai till eighth grade. Due to shortage in attendance she shifted to Government girls high school. She dropped her studies at ninth grade since she became busy with movies by then.
Nithya started her film career as a child artist in Kuruthikkalam, a Malayalam movie in 1969. She went on to act in few movies as a child artist and later became a heroine. She had acted in few Tamil, Kannada, Telugu movies as well. She is married to Ravindran, a Cameraman in Tamil movies. The couple has a daughter, Janani and a son, Arjun. She is a voice artist also in Multiple language serials and films.

Television

Filmography

Dubbing credits

Movies

Television

References

External links

 Nithya at MSI

Actresses in Malayalam cinema
Indian film actresses
Actresses in Tamil cinema
Year of birth missing (living people)
Living people
Place of birth missing (living people)
20th-century Indian actresses
21st-century Indian actresses
Indian child actresses
Actresses in Telugu cinema
Actresses in Tamil television
Indian voice actresses
Actresses in Malayalam television